Married to Medicine: Houston is an American reality television series which premiered on November 11, 2016, on the Bravo cable network. It is the first spin-off of the Married to Medicine franchise. The series chronicles the lives of five women in Houston medical community where the Texas Medical Center is located, which is the largest medical center in the world. Four of the women are doctors themselves while one is a doctors' wife.

The cast of the series include Erika Sato (a plastic surgeon), Cindi Harwood Rose (CEO of a medical non-profit married to a plastic surgeon and world-famous portrait silhouette artist who uses surgical scissors to make accurate, detailed portraits), Monica Patel (a cardiologist), Ashandra Batiste (a general dentist), Rachel Suliburk (wife of a trauma surgeon, studying to become a registered nurse), and Elly Pourasef (an audiologist).

Cast
Dr. Erika Sato
 Dr. Monica Patel
 Dr. Ashandra Batiste
 Rachel Suliburk
 Dr. Elly Pourasef

Episodes

Broadcast
The series premiered in Australia on Arena on March 4, 2017.

References

External links 
 
 

Bravo (American TV network) original programming
English-language television shows
Television shows set in Houston
2010s American reality television series
2016 American television series debuts
2016 American television series endings
Television series by Fremantle (company)
American television spin-offs
Reality television spin-offs
Women in Texas